Rhode Island is a state of the United States, located in the New England region.  The first organ said to be designed for church use was installed at Trinity Church in Newport in 1733.

The state's music scene is centered around the capital city of Providence, which became nationally known in the late 1990s for the noise rock scene that revolved around the Fort Thunder artists' collective. The state is also home to artists performing several other genres, most notably folk rock, jazz, hardcore punk, hip hop and Cape Verdean music. It is also home to the famous Newport Jazz and Newport Folk festivals.

State song
In 1996, Rhode Island declared "Rhode Island, It's for Me" as the official state song. The lyrics were written by Charlie Hall, the music was written by Maria Day, and the piece was arranged by Kathryn Chester. "Rhode Island, It's for Me" replaced "Rhode Island," which was subsequently named the official state march.

Other state-affiliated songs

"Rhode Island"

About 
“Rhode Island,” written by T. Clarke Browne, was the official state song for over fifty years when it was replaced by “Rhode Island, It’s For Me.” It has since been renamed the official state march.

Lyrics 
Here's to you, belov'd RHODE ISLAND,

With your Hills and Ocean Shore.

We are proud to hail you RHODY

And your patriots of yore.

First to claim your independence,

Great your heritage and fame.

The smallest State in all the Union,

We will glorify your name!

"Rhode Island Is Famous for You"

About 
“Rhode Island Is Famous for You” was originally written by Howard Dietz and Arthur Schwartz in 1948, for Inside U.S.A., a 1940s Broadway show about the U.S. States. The number was performed by Estelle Loring, who was awarded a Theater World Award for the piece, and Jack Haley.

“Rhode Island Is Famous for You” also served as the theme song for Buddy Cianci’s Radio Show, and was performed by Robert Goulet and Cianci himself at his 1995 mayoral inauguration.

The song has been covered by Blossom Dearie, Michael Feinstein, Nancy Lamott, Mandy Patinkin, John Pizzarelli, and Erin McKeown.

The song has recently been featured on the podcast Crimetown.

Popular music

Providence
Providence, the state's capital, has a very strong local independent music scene, known especially for its contributions to the genre of noise rock, most notably the groups Lightning Bolt, Daughters, Black Dice, and Arab on Radar. Rap artists such as Sage Francis and John Phelps, formerly known as Lunchbagg, are among the notable figures combining DIY philosophy with Hip Hop. Other rap artists such as Dee Gomes, Jae Lynx, King OSF, J Duce, and Vick Mucka have grown prominent fan bases by representing the cities harsher neighborhoods and have gone on to signing major record label deals.

Other indie rock and alternative artists from the city include Les Savy Fav, Dicky Barrett (vocalist for ska group Mighty Mighty Bosstones), ZOX, The Low Anthem, Downtown Boys, and Deer Tick. Noise/Punk 5 piece, Hairspray Queen are also from varying neighborhoods in the City.

Based in Providence, the Rhode Island Philharmonic Orchestra is one of the most influential music institutions in the state.

College Hill
Rhode Island School of Design has been the alma mater of many popular musicians. Three members of the Talking Heads met at the college, but did not form the band until they moved to New York City

Notable musicians who graduated Providence's Brown University include Wendy Carlos, Lisa Loeb, Mary Chapin Carpenter, OK Go singer, Damian Kulash, Duncan Sheik, ZOX, Lawrence, and Will Oldham, who dropped out after one semester.

Newport
Newport has a much smaller scene, with Throwing Muses being its most successful rock band. The group formed in 1981 and recorded and toured until their hiatus in 2003. The band's lead guitarist and secondary songwriter, Tanya Donnelly also formed Belly, best known for their hit "Feed the Tree", which went to #1 on the Billboard Modern Rock chart in 1994. Donnelly was also briefly guitarist for The Breeders.

The singing family The Cowsills, who had Top 40 hits from 1967 to 1969 also are from Newport.  They were the inspiration for the fictional Partridge Family.

Since 2000, Newport has cultivated a small ska punk scene, headed by the Sublime cover group Badfish and the punk band Big World.

Rockabilly singer Jody Gibson  (née Joseph Paul Katzberg), who had a Gold Record with Good Morning Captain, spent much of his later life in Newport.

Rest of the state
Other well known Rhode Island musical artists from elsewhere in the state include John Cafferty, Blu Cantrell (who had a #2 Hot 100 hit with "Hit 'Em Up Style (Oops!)" in 2001), Combustible Edison, Sage Francis, Monty Are I, Draco and the Malfoys and Billy Gillman. The pop music producer and songwriter Dr. Luke was born in Westerly.

Other music

Indigenous music

Portuguese music
Due to the large population of Portuguese immigrants in Southern New England, Portuguese traditional music is played in small communities. Usually Roman Catholic churches are the center of the communities activities, where music is played.

Fado is a form of music characterized by mournful tunes and lyrics, often about the sea or the life of the poor, and infused with a characteristic sentiment of resignation, fatefulness and melancholia (loosely captured by the word saudade, or "longing"). Fado performers play at local venues throughout Rhode Island and Southern Massachusetts.

The Azores is the major heritage of many Portuguese-Americans. In Rhode Island, most Portuguese traditional music is played by Azorean people. Azoreans maintain some distinct musical traditions, such as the traditionally fiddle-driven chamarrita dance. This dance and music is played mainly at weddings and Church festivals.

Azorean-Portuguese sensation Jorge Ferreira is a popular musician throughout New England, singing at many festivals and events.

Cape Verdean music

Of special importance is the music of the large Cape Verdean population.  Though Cape Verdean music is largely unknown outside of the expatriate community, Rhode Island is the acknowledged center for Cape Verdean morna and other styles in the United States.

Music festivals

Newport Jazz Festival
The Newport Jazz Festival began in 1954 by George Wein and has been documented on recordings by Miles Davis and Thelonious Monk, Duke Ellington, Muddy Waters, Nina Simone, Ray Charles, John Coltrane and Ella Fitzgerald and Billie Holiday. The 1958 festival was documented in the 1960 film Jazz on a Summer's Day. The festival moved to New York City in 1971. In 1985, the festival was revived in Newport as a JVC Jazz Festival.

Newport Folk Festival
The Newport Folk Festival began in 1959, co-founded by Jazz Festival founder George Wein. The festival is best known for the July 25, 1965 performance of Bob Dylan, where he performed for the first time with electric instruments. Like the Jazz Festival, the folk festival moved to New York City in 1971, but returned in 1986. Notable performers at the festivals included: Joan Baez, Phil Ochs, Bob Dylan, Buffalo Springfield, Pete Seeger, Arlo Guthrie, Richie Havens, Bonnie Raitt, Alison Krauss, Ry Cooder, Little Feat, Janis Ian, Suzanne Vega, Violent Femmes, The String Cheese Incident, Indigo Girls and The Pixies

Newport Music Festival
The Newport Music Festival is a classical music festival that began in 1969 as a summer season of the Metropolitan Opera. The outdoor venue was not conducive to classical music performance, and instead the grand rooms of the stately Newport mansions were put to use for chamber music concerts. The early concerts utilized many members of the Metropolitan Opera Orchestra. Mark P. Malkovich, III has been the general director for 31 of the 37 seasons. It has become known for giving young international artists, such as Inessa Galante, a venue for their American debut.

Sunset Music Festival
The Sunset Music Festival began in 1997 in Newport and has included performances by acts as varied as Saves the Day, Jason Mraz, Paula Cole, moe., Little Feat, Jack's Mannequin, Peter Frampton, Bo Bice, Bruce Hornsby, Guster, Something Corporate, Ben Folds (who has played at several festivals), Better Than Ezra, Cheap Trick, Gin Blossoms and Anna Nalick and also local artists like Becky Chace, Zox and Monty Are I.

List of popular musicians/bands from Rhode Island

 Amazing Royal Crowns
 Angry Salad
 AraabMuzik
 Arab on Radar
 Arc Iris
 Atwater-Donnelly
 Jon B.
 Badfish
 The Body
 Dicky Barrett
 Belly
 Black Dice (re-located to New York City)
 Blu Cantrell
 The Brother Kite
 David Byrne
 Wendy Carlos
 George M. Cohan
 Combustible Edison
 Bill Conti
 The Cowsills
 Daughters
 The Dear Hunter
 Deer Tick
 Downtown Boys
 Dropdead
 Ronnie Earl
 The Empire Shall Fall
 Face Dancer
 Fang Island
 Foxtrot Zulu
 Sage Francis
 Paul Geremia
 Billy Gilman
 Bobby Hackett 
 Scott Hamilton
 Kristin Hersh
 Honeybunch
 John Cafferty and the Beaver Brown Band
 Les Savy Fav (re-located to New York City)
 Lightning Bolt
 The Low Anthem
 Kilgore
 M-80
 Neutral Nation
 Jeffrey Osborne
 Duke Robillard
 Roomful of Blues
 Rubber Rodeo
 The Schemers
 Six Finger Satellite
 Carol Sloane
 Someday Providence
 Small Factory
 Space Needle
 Tavares
 Throwing Muses
 Velvet Crush
 Verse
 Vital Remains
 What Cheer? Brigade
 The White Mice
 The Young Adults
 ZOX

Notes

References

External links 
Roots Music in Rhode Island, Eastern Connecticut, and Southeastern Massachusetts
Rhode Island Philharmonic
The Rhode Island Music Hall of Fame

 
Rhode Island
 
Rhode Island culture
Rhode Island